Garra dampaensis is a species of cyprinid fish in the genus Garra Known only from Seling River, inside Dampa Tiger Reserve, a tributary of Khawthlang Tuipui (Karnaphuli drainage) Mizoram, India.

Etymology

The species is named after Dampa Tiger Reserve, Mizoram.

References 

Garra
Taxa named by Samuel Lalronunga
Taxa named by Lalnuntluanga
Taxa named by Lalramliana
Fish described in 2013